Dr. Lynn S. Beedle (December 7, 1917 – October 30, 2003) was an American structural engineer, the founder and the director of the Council on Tall Buildings and Urban Habitat, notable also for his design and building of skyscrapers.

The New York Times called him "an expert on tall buildings".
Beedle is also credited with making Lehigh University a center of research for civil and structural engineering because of his "groundbreaking studies on the properties of steel structures".
Beedle was elected to the National Academy of Engineering in 1972 “for contributions to steel structures research and design practice, especially plastic design and residual stress effects.”
The Council on Tall Buildings and Urban Habitat honored Beedle with creation of the Lynn S. Beedle Achievement Award.

Beedle was a recipient of a lifetime achievement award from the American Society of Civil Engineers.
He also received Franklin Institute’s Frank P. Brown Medal,
as well as the John Fritz Medal, the Berkeley Engineering Alumni Society Distinguished Engineering Alumnus Award, and was named Distinguished Professor of Civil Engineering by Lehigh University.

Life and career 
Beedle was born in Orland, California. He graduated from the University of California, Berkeley, with a B.S. degree, and joined the US Navy where he commanded underwater explosion research at the Norfolk Naval Shipyard in Virginia and served as Deputy Officer in Charge of the Nuclear testing at Bikini Atoll in 1946.
In 1952 he received his doctorate from Lehigh University in structural engineering after 5 years of graduate studies and working there as an instructor.

References

External links
Lynn Beedle's tribute to Fazlur Rahman Khan on the South Asian American Digital Archive (SAADA)

1917 births
2003 deaths
American structural engineers
Engineers from California
Lehigh University faculty
Lehigh University alumni
UC Berkeley College of Engineering alumni
Members of the United States National Academy of Engineering
People from Orland, California
20th-century American engineers
20th-century American inventors
United States Navy personnel of World War II